Julbernardia is a genus of plants in the family Fabaceae. There are eight species found in tropical Africa. They are medium-sized trees.

Species accepted by the Plants of the World Online as of February 2021:

Julbernardia baumii 
Julbernardia brieyi 
Julbernardia globiflora 
Julbernardia gossweileri 
Julbernardia hochreutineri 
Julbernardia letouzeyi 
Julbernardia magnistipulata 
Julbernardia paniculata 
Julbernardia pellegriniana 
Julbernardia seretii 
Julbernardia unijugata

References

 
Fabaceae genera
Taxonomy articles created by Polbot